Dowell is a village in Jackson County, Illinois, United States. The population was estimated to be 385 at the 2020 census, 
down from 408 at the 2010 census.

History 

Dowell was founded as a coal town and named by Du Quoin attorney George Dowell and William Lafont. They requested bids for property development as early as 1917. In 1922, the town's population was over 2,000. 

In February, 1920, the Dowell State Bank was opened in the town. Town founders George Dowell and William Lafont were among the first directors of the bank.  It was the scene of a bank robbery on September 30, 1924.  The bank closed in 1932 following embezzlement charges against its president, William Lafont.   

In late 1920, construction began on a railroad depot serving the Illinois Central Railroad. 

Coal mining brought many eastern European immigrants to the village, including Rusyns. At one time there was a Russian Orthodox church which is now closed. The area is still served by a church in nearby Royalton.

Kathleen Coal Mine

The town has supported miners from local coal mines. The Kathleen Coal Mine was located northeast of the village.  It was opened and operated by the Union Colliery Company.  
It was the scene of a disaster in 1921 and again in 1936. In early 1937, it was the largest producing mine in Jackson county, producing over 5,000 tons of coal per day and employing over 500 men. 

The mine was closed in November, 1946 after the coal vein was no longer accessible. On the site as of December, 2021 is Cobin's Salvage Yard.  There are few remaining signs of the mine that once built the village of Dowell.  A small concrete structure, the mine tipple, is the only structure that remains from the mine.  

A second mine, known as the "New Kathleen", was opened in January 1946.  This second mine closed by 1958.  , Land scars are still visible from this mine.

Baseball Team

The town hosted a baseball team that consisted of players who worked in the Kathleen Mine.  The team was named the Dowell Kathleens.  They occasionally played against the St. Louis Browns, a professional team,  as well as the Belleville Stags, a minor league team.

Dowell today 

With the departure of the Kathleen Mine, Dowell has become a quiet residential community. The mine has been suspected of causing sinkholes in the village.

Demographics

As of the census of 2000, there were 441 people, 199 households, and 125 families residing in the village. The racial makeup of the village was 98.41% White, 0.23% African American, 0.91% Native American, and 0.45% from two or more races. Hispanic or Latino of any race were 0.45% of the population.

There were 199 households, out of which 28.1% had children under the age of 18 living with them, 47.2% were married couples living together, 12.6% had a female householder with no husband present, and 36.7% were non-families. 29.1% of all households were made up of individuals, and 17.6% had someone living alone who was 65 years of age or older.  The average household size was 2.22 and the average family size was 2.75.

In the village, the population was spread out, with 21.5% under the age of 18, 8.6% from 18 to 24, 26.5% from 25 to 44, 22.2% from 45 to 64, and 21.1% who were 65 years of age or older.  The median age was 40 years. For every 100 females, there were 83.8 males.  For every 100 females age 18 and over, there were 89.1 males.

The median income for a household in the village was $24,750, and the median income for a family was $28,958. Males had a median income of $24,821 versus $16,719 for females. The per capita income for the village was $12,464.  About 10.3% of families and 13.3% of the population were below the poverty line, including 21.7% of those under age 18 and 10.6% of those age 65 or over.

Geography
Dowell is located in northeastern Jackson County at  (37.939545, -89.239553). U.S. Route 51 passes through the eastern side of the village, leading south  to De Soto and north  to Du Quoin.

Notable person

 Rudolph Wanderone Jr. (a.k.a. Minnesota Fats), noted billiards player,

Gallery

References

External links
Minnesota Fats stories

Villages in Jackson County, Illinois
Villages in Illinois
Coal towns in Illinois
Populated places in Southern Illinois
Rusyn-American history